Concan is a small unincorporated community in Uvalde County. It sits along the Frio River close to Garner State Park and is a popular destination for summer vacationers. It is known for excellent birdwatching in the spring.  A Roy Bechtol-designed 18-hole golf course called Concan Country Club or the Golf Club at Concan is open to the public. The area is dominated by large cattle, sheep and goat ranches some of which date back to when German emigrants settled this area.

Several outfitters in the area haul swimmers and tubers up the Frio River to designated drop-off points, then pick them up downstream.

Neal's Dining Hall in Concan is featured in a 2012 episode of the syndicated television series Texas Country Reporter hosted by Bob Phillips.

The name "Concan" may have originated from the card game Conquian.

References

External links
 Concan.com website with info, links and photos of Concan and the Frio River
 Texas Hill Country River Region

Unincorporated communities in Uvalde County, Texas
Unincorporated communities in Texas